Seal Rock, Seal Rocks, or Seal's Rock may refer to:

 Seal Rock
 Seal Rock, Farallon Islands, California
 Seal Rock (San Mateo County, California)
 Seal Rock State Recreation Site, Oregon
 Seal Rock, Oregon
 Seal Rock, a National Register of Historic Places site in the vicinity of the Oregon community
 Seal Rocks, the offshore rocks for which the community of Seal Rock is named
 Seal Rock, Isles of Scilly

 Seal Rocks
 Seal Rocks (San Francisco, California)
 Seal Rocks, New South Wales
 Seal Rocks (Victoria) and Seal Rocks Sea Life Centre, Phillip Island, Victoria, Australia
 Seal's Rock, Lundy, Devonshire, United Kingdom

See also
 Seal Island (disambiguation)
 Seal rock, in petroleum extraction technology